Vietnamese mythology ( 神話越南) comprises national myths, legends or fairy tales from the Vietnamese people with aspects of folk religion in Vietnam. Vietnamese folklore and oral traditions may have also been influenced by historical contact with neighbouring Tai-speaking populations, other Austroasiatic-speaking peoples, as well as with people from the region now known as Greater China.

Myth of national origin
The mythology of the ethnic Vietnamese people (the Việt 越) has been transferred through oral traditions and in writing. The story of Lạc Long Quân (雒龍君) and Âu Cơ (嫗姬) has been cited as the common creation myth of the Vietnamese people. The story details how two progenitors, the man known as the "Dragon Lord of Lạc" and the woman known as the "Fairy Lady of Âu", gave birth to a "hundred eggs, fifty of which hatched, settled on land and eventually became the Vietnamese people".

However, the story, dubbed Con rồng cháu tiên (昆蠬𡥙仙 "Descendants of the Dragon and the Fairy"), is labeled as a truyền thuyết ("legend" 傳說), a "type of folkloric tale about historical characters and events, usually embellished with fantastical elements," and is more akin to other fantastical legends, such as the story of Lê Lợi 黎利 discovering a mythical sword from a magical turtle.

Đại Việt sử ký toàn thư (大越史記全書, Complete Annals of Đại Việt) proposed more details on the origins of the two progenitors, for example on how Lạc Long Quân was the son of Kinh Dương Vương (涇陽王), who was in turn descended from the Viêm Đế or Yan Emperor (炎帝)/Thần Nông or Shennong (神農).

Additionally, Ngô Sĩ Liên (吳士連), the author of the text, cited elements from Lĩnh Nam chích quái. Thần Nông and their descendants leading to Kinh Dương Vương, Lạc Long Quân and Âu Cơ, and even commented on the potential familial bond between this couple (Lạc's father Kinh Dương Vương and Âu's grandfather Đế Nghi were brothers, both of Thần Nông descent).

Creation myths
The world was created by a primordial god called Thần Trụ Trời (神柱𡗶 "heaven-pillar god"). This god, supposedly, built a stone pillar to separate heaven and earth from a chaotic mess where neither the world or humanity had existed, and once he was finished, he destroyed the pillar, which resulted in the creation of landforms such as mountains and islands. After the division of the Thần Trụ trời divided the world into Heaven and Earth, other gods appeared to follow in the work of building this world. There are many such gods, such as Thần Sao, Thần Sông, Thần Núi, Thần Biển... and other giant gods.
Folks have credited these gods in the verse handed down from generation to generation:

"Ông Đếm Cát 

Ông Tát Bể

Ông Kể Sao

Ông Đào Sông

Ông Trồng Cây

Ông Xây Rú

Ông Trụ Trời..."

Popular heroes and gods
Figures in Vietnamese mythology include The Four Immortals: the giant boy Thánh Gióng, mountain god Tản Viên Sơn Thánh, Chử Đồng Tử marsh boy, princess Liễu Hạnh.

One of the Four Immortals also reemerges in the fighting between Sơn Tinh and Thủy Tinh "the god of the mountain and the god of the Water." Historical legend occurs in the story of the Thuận Thiên "Heaven's Will" magical sword of Emperor Lê Lợi.

Folk mythology includes figures such as the mười hai bà mụ "Twelve Midwives", twelve fairies who teach one-month-old babies skills such as sucking and smiling.

Popular myths, legends and stories 
A list of some popular fairy tales or Vietnamese myths and legends includes but is not limited to:

 Lạc Long Quân and Âu Cơ (The Vietnamese creation origin myth)
 The legend of Son Tinh and Thuy Tinh (Mountain God and Water God)
 The betrayal of An Dương Vương
 Hoan Kiem Lake – Le Loi and the Magical Sword 
 Ông Táo – the Kitchen Gods
 The origins of bánh chưng - the story of Lang Lieu
 Four Elements – the Turtle, the Dragon, the Unicorn and the Phoenix

King of the gods
The king of the gods in Vietnamese mythology is Ông Trời (翁𡗶 "God of heaven"), then due to the influence of China, he was identified with Jade Emperor so he was also called Ngọc Hoàng Thượng Đế (玉皇上帝), commonly referred to as Ngọc Hoàng (玉皇).

See also 
East Asia
 Chinese creation myths, Chinese mythology
 Japanese creation myth, Japanese mythology
 Korean creation narratives, Korean mythology
Southeast Asia/East Asia
 Tai-speakers: Zhuang people, Tày people, Nung people, Dai people, etc. 
 Austroasiatic-speakers: Muong people, Thổ people, etc.

References

Further reading
 Nguyen Thi Kim Ngan | Alex Wade (Reviewing editor) (2020). "Vietnamese religion, folklore and literature: Archetypal journeys from folktales to medieval fantasy short stories". In: Cogent Arts & Humanities, 7:1. .

 
Religion in Vietnam